Naraghi Lake is an artificial lake within the central valley city of Modesto, in Stanislaus County, California.

History
Naraghi Lake was excavated in the 1980s as one of a planned series of water features for a large residential and commercial development complex straddling both sides of Oakdale Road. The lake is named after the Naraghi family, who were at one time large landowners in the area, and who planned the initial development. Shortly after excavating the lake, the Naraghi development was scrapped because of financial and market problems, leaving the lake as the only evidence of the plan that had been abandoned. The surrounding land was sold off and subsequently developed. The lake remains the property of the Naraghi family.

It was open to the public for fishing and recreational use until 2004, when liability issues and problems related to people dumping invasive species into the lake including a fish related to the piranha, finally prompted the Naraghi family to fence in the perimeter.

Over the years, numerous proposals for the land and the lake have been discussed, including converting it into a city park, building private residences around its perimeter, and building apartment or office complexes on the property. Most of these plans are hamstrung by the now-limited amount of land remaining around the lake, and have not been pursued beyond the discussion phase.

Geography

Naraghi Lake is supplied from MID canals and pipelines. It was built by excavating a hole in the otherwise flat terrain and was lined with bentonite to eliminate percolation.

Fish
The commonly found fish in the lake are Largemouth Bass, Smallmouth Bass, Crappie, Catfish, Spotted Bass, White Bass, Striped Bass, and Trout. Other wildlife like ducks and geese can also be found in and near the lake.

See also
List of lakes in California

References

Lakes of Stanislaus County, California
Modesto, California
Lakes of Northern California
Lakes of California